The 1968 United States Senate election in Alaska took place on November 5, 1968. Incumbent Democratic U.S. Senator Ernest Gruening ran for a second full term in office but finished behind Speaker of the Alaska House of Representatives Mike Gravel in the Democratic primary. Gruening launched an write-in bid for the seat in the general election, but finished third to Gravel and Republican former Anchorage mayor Elmer Rasmuson.

Gravel would later lose the primary in 1980 to Gruening's grandson Clark. 

This would be the first of 3 times where the incumbent holder of Alaska's Class 3 U.S. Senate seat was defeated in the primary while running for re-election. 

Future Senator Ted Stevens also ran in the Republican primary, but lost to Rasmuson by around 1,000 votes. When incumbent Democratic Class 2 Senator Bob Bartlett died that December, Governor Wally Hickel appointed Stevens to the vacant seat, giving Stevens a seniority advantage of 10 days over the incoming Gravel.

Primary election

Democratic
 Mike Gravel, former State Representative and Speaker of the Alaska House of Representatives from Anchorage
 Ernest Gruening, incumbent U.S. Senator since 1959

Results

Republican
 Elmer Rasmuson, former Mayor of Anchorage and member of the University of Alaska Board of Regents
 Ted Stevens, State Representative from Anchorage, State House Majority Leader, former Solicitor of the Interior and nominee for Senate in 1962

Results

General election

See also 
 1968 United States Senate elections
 1968 United States House of Representatives election in Alaska

References

1968
Alaska
United States Senate
Mike Gravel